Adaina beckeri is a moth of the family Pterophoridae. It is found in Costa Rica and Belize.

The wingspan is about 14 mm. The head is scaled and pale brown. The antennae are yellow-white and the thorax is greasy grey. The forewings are yellow-white with brown markings and yellow-white fringes. The underside is brown, changing to yellowish towards the apex of both lobes. The hindwings and fringes are brown-grey and the underside is brown.

Adults have been recorded in July.

Etymology
The species is named after its collector, Dr. V.O. Becker.

References

Moths described in 1992
Oidaematophorini